Lynn Kimsey is an entomologist, taxonomist, director of the Bohart Museum of Entomology and professor of entomology at the University of California, Davis since 1989. Her specialties are bees and wasps; and insect diversity.

She received a doctorate in entomology from UC Davis in 1979 and joined the faculty there in 1989.

She has described almost 300 new species. In 2020 she was awarded the C. W. Woodworth Award by the Entomological Society of America.

Her husband Robert Kimsey is a forensic entomologist in the UC Davis Department of Entomology.

References

External links 
 UC Davis page

Living people
Year of birth missing (living people)
University of California, Davis alumni
University of California, Davis faculty
American entomologists
Directors of museums in the United States
Women museum directors
American taxonomists
Women taxonomists
Women entomologists